Harlandale High School is a public high school located in the city of San Antonio, Texas (USA) and classified as a 5A school by the UIL. This school is the flagship school for the Harlandale Independent School District located in south central Bexar County. In 2017, the school was rated "Met Standard" by the Texas Education Agency, with a 2-Star Distinction for Academic Achievements in ELA/Reading and Post-Secondary Readiness.

Athletics
The Harlandale Indians compete in these sports - 

Baseball
Basketball
Cross Country
Football
Golf
Soccer
Softball
Tennis
Track and Field
Volleyball

State titles
Volleyball
1968(4A)

State finalist 
Volleyball
1967(4A), 1969(4A), 1974(4A)

Band
The Harlandale band is often referred to as the Million Dollar Band From Indian Land.

Notable alumni

Jesse Borrego (class of 1980) – actor who played Cruz Candelaria in Blood In Blood Out
Wilbur Huckle (class of 1960) – baseball player and manager in the New York Mets minor league system
Milton A. Lee (class of 1967) – recipient of the Medal of Honor in the Vietnam War, killed in action in 1968
Jesse James Leija (class of 1984) – former professional boxer
Leo Pacheco (class of 1976) – state representative
George Boyd Pierce (class of 1959) – former member of the Texas House of Representatives from District 122
Ciro Rodriguez – former U.S. Representative
Tobin Rote (class of 1946) – pro football quarterback, won NFL and AFL championships
Frank Tejeda – U.S. Marine and politician
Fadli Zon – deputy speaker of the Indonesian People's Representative Council

 Inductee of the Harlandale Independent School District Hall of Fame.

References

External links
Harlandale ISD
Harlandale High School Fanpage

High schools in San Antonio
Public high schools in Texas
1924 establishments in Texas